"Think" is the first single from Hack, the second album by Information Society.  It was released in 1990. The song was accompanied by a music video.

Track listing
CD single
 Think (Hack radio edit) – 3:58
 Think (Virtual Reality radio edit) – 4:15
 Think (Bluebox 2600 mix) – 6:50
 Think (Virtual Reality Mix) – 7:04
 Think (Phone Phreak Mix) – 6:24
 Think (Mindmeld Mix) – 5:19
 Think (Phone Phreak dub) – 4:54

12" single
 Think (Virtual Reality radio edit) – 4:15
 Think (Bluebox 2600 mix) – 6:50
 Think (Virtual Reality Mix) – 7:04
 Think (Phone Phreak Mix) – 6:24
 Think (Acappella) – 2:05

Cassette single
 Think (Hack radio edit) – 3:58
 Think (Virtual Reality radio edit) – 4:15

Cassette Maxi-Single
 Think (Virtual Reality radio edit) – 4:15
 Think (Bluebox 2600 mix) – 6:50
 Think (Virtual Reality Mix) – 7:04
 Think (Phone Phreak Mix) – 6:24
 Think (Virtual Reality Dub)

Charts

External links
Think - official InSoc website

Notes

1990 singles
1990 songs
Information Society (band) songs
Tommy Boy Records singles